Daniil Yuryevich Move (born on 11 December 1985, in Moscow, Russia) is a Russian race car driver. Daniil holds the title "master of sport on international level" in Russia.
While growing up, Daniil studied at School #11 in Moscow with a concentration in Chinese. Later, he completed school externally, with honors. After finishing school, he attended Moscow Institute of Economics Management and Law, from where he graduated at the top of his class. Daniil was always interested in sports with six years of professional soccer, karate, and others. These sports were suddenly left in the shadows, when as a joke, he was offered an opportunity to drive at a professional karting event. Since then, he worked as a mechanic in various teams, earning money to spend on amateur competitions, in order to take part in professional races.

Career

2003
In 2003, as a prize in amateur competition in Moscow karting championship, Move participated in 2 races of British Formula Ford Championship, where he took third and  first places.

2004
For 2004 season, Russian Law Firm Berg & Green was so impressed with Move's achievements, that they provided financial sponsorship for him. In the first season of Russian championship Formula RUS he finished as a runner-up (8 races, 2 wins, 6 podiums, 2 pole-positions) and ranked the best rookie driver (Winner in Junior ranks).

2005
In 2005, Move used to be a test driver of the first  Russian carbon fiber monocoque based Formula 3 chassis ArtTech. Move also participated in two Formula RUS races where he took lights-to-flag victories in both, preceded by two pole positions and fastest lap times in all practice sessions

2006
In 2006, Move participated in several racing championships of F3000 International Masters, where he took third place in Oschersleben, Germany, and fourth place in Magny-Cours, France. He became the first Russian driver in history to take the podium in F3000 International Masters. During the same season he participated in the first race of Formula RUS, which he won.

2007-2008
After doing some test runs in Formula Renault 3.5 car Move had signed a contract to participate in 2007 season   with Austrian team Interwetten Racing. His debut season became very disappointing, whereas Daniil hadn't scored any point. More over, in Monaco he appeared unable to make into the field, recording a DNQ. At the end of 2007' season Move tested in International Formula Master (where he showed the best results) and in two races of that championship. In the first race he was forced to retire due to an accident. However, in Monza, Italy, he took pole-position and finished fourth despite of engine issues. In 2008, he had returned to Formula Renault 3.5 with the KTR team. The season started with no signs of improvement, unless he scored his first points by finishing fifth in the second race of the weekend. However, that appeared to be a one-off, the following races brought no fruition and he has subsequently left the team after Hungaroring. He started 2009 once again in Formula Renault 3.5, now with the P1 Motorsport. As before, the season had started for Daniil with two finishes outside of the top 10. Though, at the next venue, in Spa he scored points in both occasions, for fifth and fourth places. His pace was improving during the season resulting in 5 races in a row, highlighted with a maiden podium finish at the first race in Nürburgring, a result he repeated in the final race of the season in Aragon, eventually completing the season rounding out the top 10. Move's progress was noticed by the Lotus company, which at that time was actively promoting its brand by starting out numerous motorsport projects. Thus, Move had signed a contract with Lotus F1 Team, thereby joining the Lotus Junior Team in Formula Renault 3.5 for the season of 2010. The season turned to be a disaster. Only on four occasions he had scored points, with the best result of seventh, which he had scored at the season-opening venue in Aragon. Eventually Daniil has left the team with one venue to go.

2009-2013
From 2009 to 2013 Move continued participating in Formula Renault 3.5 Series, showing top results in tests and races. He made the podium on numerous occasions, as well as earned points. During 2009 and 2011 seasons he finished in the top 10 of the championship. And achieved a third place for P1 Motorsport in 2009 Teams Championship.

In 2013 season, with stable speed throughout, Move raced in Blancpain Endurance Series on Ferrari for the Russian team.

2015-2016
NASCAR, GT
Testing and research work for different teams

Other
In 2012, the largest karting center in Europe MOVE kart was opened, which was named after Move. Kart center operates Move's auto-racing school for all ages.

Racing record

Career summary

Complete Formula Renault 3.5 Series results
(key) (Races in bold indicate pole position) (Races in italics indicate fastest lap)

References

External links

 Official website

1985 births
Living people
Russian racing drivers
International Formula Master drivers
World Series Formula V8 3.5 drivers
Blancpain Endurance Series drivers
24 Hours of Spa drivers
Sportspeople from Moscow
SMP Racing drivers
AF Corse drivers
Comtec Racing drivers
P1 Motorsport drivers
KTR drivers